Dunrobin Castle (mostly 1835–1845 — present) is a stately home in Sutherland, in the Highland area of Scotland, as well as the family seat of the Earl of Sutherland and the Clan Sutherland.

Dunrobin's origins lie in the Middle Ages, but most of the present building and the gardens were added by Sir Charles Barry between 1835 and 1850. Some of the original building is visible in the interior courtyard, despite a number of expansions and alterations that made it the largest house in the north of Scotland. After being used as a boarding school for seven years, it is now open to the public.

History

The lands of Sutherland were acquired before 1211, by Hugh, Lord of Duffus, grandson of the Flemish nobleman Freskin. The Earldom of Sutherland was created around 1235 for Hugh's son, William, surmised to have descended from the House of Moray by the female line. The castle may have been built on the site of an early medieval fort, but the oldest surviving portion, with an iron yett, is first mentioned in 1401. Unusually, the ceilings of each floor were formed by stone vaults rather than being timber. The castle is thought to be named after Robert Sutherland, 6th Earl of Sutherland (d.1444).

Dunrobin Castle was built in the midst of a tribal society, with Norse and Gaelic in use at the time. Robert the Bruce planted the Gordons, who supported his claim to the crown, at Huntly in Aberdeenshire, and they were created Earls of Huntly in 1445. The Earldom passed to the Gordon family in the 16th century when the 8th Earl of Sutherland gave his daughter Elizabeth in marriage to Adam Gordon.

In 1518, in the absence of Adam Gordon, the castle was captured by Alexander Sutherland, the legitimate heir to the Earldom of Sutherland. The Gordons quickly retook the castle, captured Alexander and placed his head on a spear on top of the castle tower. Alexander's son John made an attempt on the castle in 1550, but was killed in the castle garden. During the more peaceful 17th century, the keep was extended with the addition of a large house, built around a courtyard to the south-west.

During the Jacobite Rising of 1745, the Jacobites under Charles Edward Stuart stormed Dunrobin Castle without warning, because the Clan Sutherland supported the British government. The 17th Earl of Sutherland, who had changed his surname from Gordon to Sutherland, narrowly escaped them, exiting through a back door. He sailed for Aberdeen where he joined the Duke of Cumberland's army. On the death of the 18th Earl in 1766, the house passed to his daughter, Elizabeth, who married the politician George Leveson-Gower, later created 1st Duke of Sutherland. In 1785, the house was altered and extended again.

Between 1835 and 1850, Sir Charles Barry remodelled the castle in the Scottish Baronial style for the 2nd Duke of Sutherland. Barry had been the architect for the Palace of Westminster, home to the House of Commons, and was much in demand. He was influenced by his recently completed  Italianate Garden at Trentham, the Duke’s English seat. The 14th-century tower, and the 17th-century and 18th-century extensions, were retained, and survive within Barry's 19th-century work.

Dunrobin Castle railway station, on the Far North Line, was opened in 1870, as a private station for the castle. The present waiting room was constructed in 1902, and is a category B listed building.

In 1915, the building was in use as a naval hospital when fire damaged the roof and much of the interior, but was confined to the newer additions by Barry. Scottish architect Sir Robert Lorimer was engaged to renovate the house following the First World War. From the 1920s the increasing cost of employment led to jobs such as the pollarding of trees being neglected. When 5th Duke died in 1963, the Earldom and the house went to his niece, the recent Countess of Sutherland, while the Dukedom had to pass to a male heir and went to John Egerton, Earl of Ellesmere. Between 1965 and 1972, the house became a boarding school for boys, taking on forty boys and five teachers in its first year. Since 1973, the house and grounds have been open to the public, with private accommodation retained for the use of the Sutherland family.

Architecture

There are 189 rooms within the castle, making it the largest in the northern Highlands. Much of Barry's interior was destroyed by the fire of 1915, leading to the restoration by Sir Robert Lorimer, although he incorporated surviving 17th-century and 18th-century work, including wood carvings attributed to Grinling Gibbons. Externally, the castle has elements inspired by the work of the French architect Viollet-le-Duc, such as the pyramidal roof over the main entrance.

The portion built by Barry uses freestone in broadly the same style as the turreted parts from the 16th and 17th centuries, but borrows significant elements from the château style. A large quadrangular pile of four stories, with towers at each corner, connects to the older castle by a building of three stories and containing the stately apartments.

There is no indication as to the origin of the name.

Interior

In the entrance hall is a frieze of the armorials used by past earls of Sutherland. The drawing room, made from two previous rooms by Lorimer during his restoration of the castle, looks out over the gardens and sea, and contains large Canalettos and 18th-century tapestries, as well as portraits by Hoppner and Reynolds. Housing over 10,000 books, the library features a painting by Philip de László of Duchess Eileen, as well as a mahogany Chippendale table.

Gardens

The French influence extends into the gardens, completed in 1850, with Barry taking inspiration from the French formal style of the Gardens of Versailles. Each parterre is set around a circular pool with a fountain, with the essential layout the same since it was created in around 1848. Barry designed the parterre as an optical illusion, seen from above they appear to stretch beyond their physical layout, by narrowing it gradually.

Museum
A museum displays the trophy heads of animals shot by family members on safari, ethnographic items from around the world and an important collection of archaeological artefacts. The museum retains its Victorian-Edwardian arrangement, and is housed in an 18th-century summer-house adjoining the formal gardens. Historically, the castle is a category A listed building, and the gardens are included in the Inventory of Gardens and Designed Landscapes in Scotland.

The castle is open to visitors between April and October each year. Falconry displays are held in the castle's gardens by a resident Falconer.

References

Notes

Sources

Further reading

External links

 
 Site dedicated to Dunrobin School

Castles in Highland (council area)
Clan Sutherland
Country houses in Highland (council area)
Mock castles in Scotland
Renaissance Revival architecture in the United Kingdom
Scottish baronial architecture
Inventory of Gardens and Designed Landscapes
Category A listed buildings in Highland (council area)
Listed castles in Scotland
!
Gardens in Highland (council area)
Rose gardens in Scotland
Historic house museums in Highland (council area)
Natural history museums in Scotland
Archaeological museums in Scotland
Renaissance architecture in Scotland
Buildings and structures in Sutherland
Charles Barry buildings